Devadas Brothers is a 2021 Indian Tamil-language comedy drama film directed by Janakiraman and starring Dhruvva, Ajai Prasath, Hari Krishnan and Bala Saravanan. Produced by Mathiyazhagan, it was released on 3 September 2021.

Cast 

Dhruvva as Ram
Ajai Prasath as Krishna
Hari Krishnan as Jegathesh
Bala Saravanan as Sathya
Sanchita Shetty
Shilpa Manjunath
Aara
Deepthi Manne
Samuthirakani as Writer
Robo Shankar as Lakshman
Thambi Ramaiah
Mayilsamy
Deepa Shankar as Jegathesh's mother

Production 
The film began its shoot in 2016 and was completed in early 2017. Promotions for the film's release began in 2020.

Soundtrack
Soundtrack composed by Dharan Kumar.
Vaa Machan - Michael
Dama Duma - Unni Nair
Rotula Train - Dharan
Soodana Theneer - Dharan
Aendi Paatha - Anthony Daasan
Thanga Magan - Dharan

Release 
The film had a theatrical release on 3 September 2021, and became the first Tamil film to release in Tamil Nadu after the second wave of COVID-19. A critic from The Times of India noted "Devadas Brothers is an uneven message movie, and gave the film two stars out of five. A reviewer from OTTPlay noted "despite a run time of less than 100 minutes, it is an uphill task to sit through the movie, thanks to weak characterizations, generic staging of sequences and cringeworthy dialogues".

A month later, the film was released on streaming platform Netflix.

References

External links  
 

2021 films
2020s Tamil-language films
Indian romantic drama films